Kichatna Spire, sometimes called the Kichatna Spires, is a  spire-shaped peak in the Kichatna Mountains of the Alaska Range, in Denali National Park and Preserve, southwest of Denali. Cul-de-sac, Shelf and Shadows Glaciers originate at Kichatna Spire.

See also

List of mountain peaks of North America
List of mountain peaks of the United States
List of mountain peaks of Alaska
List of Ultras of the United States

References

External links

Alaska Range
Mountains of Matanuska-Susitna Borough, Alaska
Denali National Park and Preserve
Mountains of Alaska